Miss Colombia 2003, the 69th Miss Colombia pageant, was held in Cartagena de Indias, Colombia, on November 12, 2003, after three weeks of events.  The winner of the pageant was Catherine Daza Manchola, Miss Valle.

The pageant was broadcast live on RCN TV from the Centro de Convenciones Julio Cesar Turbay in Cartagena de Indias, Colombia. At the conclusion of the final night of competition, outgoing titleholder Diana Lucia Mantilla crowned Catherine Daza Manchola of Valle as the new Miss Colombia.

Results

Placements

Special awards
 Miss Photogenic (voted by press reporters) - Maria Virginia Balcázar Bolaños (Cauca)
 Best Body Figura Bodytech - Catherine Daza Manchola (Valle)
 Miss Congeniality - Liliana del Carmen Morales Barrios (Bolívar)
 Best Costume - Catherine Daza Manchola (Valle)
 Reina de la Policia - Alba Lucía Galindo Urzola (Córdoba)
 Señorita Puntualidad - María del Pilar Jaramillo Ruiz (Meta)
 Miss Elegance - Catherine Daza Manchola (Valle)

Delegates
The Miss Colombia 2003 delegates are:

Antioquia - Monica Patricia Jaramillo Giraldo
Atlántico - Caroline Bradford Sprouse
Bogotá D.C. - Angélica María Sierra Barreto 
Bolívar - Carolina Esther Garcia Grau
Boyacá - Adriana Lizeth Alfonso Piñeros
Caldas - Valentina Gonzáles Giraldo
Cartagena DT y C - Jeymmy Paola Vargas Gomez
Cauca - Maria Virginia Balcázar Bolaños
Córdoba - Alba Lucia Galindo Urzola
Chocó - Carolina Trelles Torres
Cundinamarca - Diana Angelica Cendales Cuevas
Guajira - Melitza Mercedes Bolaño Duarte
Huila - Leydi Johana Polanco Lozano
Magdalena - Maria Consuelo Zuñiga Aguilera
Medellín A.M. - Deisy Catalina Valencia Deossa
Meta - Maria del Pilar Jaramillo Ruiz
Norte de Santander - Carla Lorena Pinto Jaimes
Risaralda - Giovanna Gallo Patiño
San Andrés and Providencia -  Ethel Carolina Davis Corpus
Santander - Adriana Orrego Lombana
Tolima - Nathalia González Bernal
Valle - Catherine Daza Manchola

References and footnotes

External links
Official site

Miss Colombia
2003 in Colombia
2003 beauty pageants